Kisak-Kain (Kiśäkqayın) is a rural locality (a selo) and the administrative centre of Kisak-Kainsky Selsoviet, Yanaulsky District, Bashkortostan, Russia. The population was 519 as of 2010. There are 5 streets.

Geography 
Kisak-Kain is located 25 km southwest of Yanaul (the district's administrative centre) by road. Tartar is the nearest rural locality.

References 

Rural localities in Yanaulsky District